The Electoral district of Evandale was a single-member electoral district of the Tasmanian House of Assembly. It centred on the town of Evandale to the south of Launceston.

The seat, created in 1856 under the name Morven, was established under the name Evandale ahead of the 1886 election. The seat was abolished at the 1903 election, when it merged with the neighbouring seat of Selby to form the new seat of North Esk.

Members for Evandale

References
 
 
 Parliament of Tasmania (2006). The Parliament of Tasmania from 1956

Evandale